Cold on the Shoulder is Canadian singer Gordon Lightfoot's 11th original album, released in 1975 on the Reprise Records label.

Track listing
Side 1
 "Bend in the Water" – 2:59
 "Rainy Day People" – 2:48
 "Cold on the Shoulder" – 3:00
 "The Soul Is the Rock" – 5:49
 "Bells of the Evening" – 3:56
 "Rainbow Trout" – 2:51
Side 2
 "A Tree Too Weak to Stand" – 3:22
 "All the Lovely Ladies" – 3:35
 "Fine as Fine Can Be" – 2:58
 "Cherokee Bend" – 5:02
 "Now and Then" – 3:09
 "Slide on Over" – 3:43

All compositions by Lightfoot.

Chart performance

Personnel
 Gordon Lightfoot - main performer, 6- and 12-string acoustic guitars, piano, vocals
 Pee Wee Charles - steel guitar
 Terry Clements - acoustic guitar
 Nick DeCaro - accordion, celesta, orchestral arrangements
 Jim Gordon - drums, percussion
 Rick Haynes - bass
 Milt Holland - percussion
 Suzie McCune - vocals
 Red Shea - classical guitar, acoustic guitar, Fender Telecaster
 John Stockfish - bass
 Jackie Ward Singers - vocals
 Jack Zaza - wind

References

External links
Album lyrics and chords

Gordon Lightfoot albums
1975 albums
Albums produced by Lenny Waronker
Reprise Records albums